Fazal-ur-Rehman (born 15 March 1995) is a Pakistani cricketer. He made his List A debut for Federally Administered Tribal Areas in the 2018–19 Quaid-e-Azam One Day Cup on 6 September 2018. He made his Twenty20 debut for Federally Administered Tribal Areas in the 2018–19 National T20 Cup on 15 December 2018.

References

External links
 

1995 births
Living people
Pakistani cricketers
Federally Administered Tribal Areas cricketers
Place of birth missing (living people)